Alex Huang is an American software engineer and was the co-founder of Cloud.com and software architect for CloudStack. He is currently the senior principal engineer with the Cloud Platforms groups at Citrix Systems after their acquisition of Cloud.com, where he was co-founder of Cloud.com, in July 2011.

Biography 

Huang has a bachelor's degree from UC Berkeley from Yale University and a master's degree from Stanford, both in computer science.

Huang severed various engineering positions  in the software industry, he has been the lead engineer at @Motion, software architect at Openwave, chief architect at Ad Infuse and founding engineer and software architect at Cloud.com. He now serves as the senior principal engineer at Citrix Systems where he leads the engineering team at the Cloud Platforms Group. He's a PPMC member and committer at Apache CloudStack (under ASF incubator).

References

External links 
 The Register - Cloud.com takes on virty infrastructure
 Alex's talk on CloudStack Storage
 Alex's talk on CloudStack Architecture

Stanford University alumni
Living people
American people of Chinese descent
Year of birth missing (living people)